Led by new manager Billy Martin, the 1969 Minnesota Twins won the newly formed American League West with a 97–65 record, nine games over the second-place Oakland Athletics. The Twins were swept by the Baltimore Orioles in the first American League Championship Series.

Regular season 
In the first year of divisional play, the Twins won the American League West, led by Rod Carew (.332, his first AL batting title), Tony Oliva (.309, 24 HR, 101 RBI) and league MVP Harmon Killebrew (49 HR, 140 RBI – both league-leading totals). Carew stole home 7 times. Leadoff batter César Tovar was third in the AL with 45 stolen bases. Jim Perry and Dave Boswell each won 20 games, the first and only time a Minnesota club has held two 20-game winners. Reliever Ron Perranoski became the first Twin to lead the AL in saves with 31. Pitcher Jim Kaat won his 8th Gold Glove Award.

In the May 18 loss to Detroit, the Twins stole five bases during the third inning to tie a major league record.  Four bases were stolen during Harmon Killebrew's at-bat: César Tovar stole home, and Rod Carew stole second, third and then home.

On June 21 in Oakland, the Twins were tied 3–3 with the A's going into the tenth inning.  In the top of the inning, Minnesota scored eleven times, tying a 1928 New York Yankees record.  The Twins won the game 14–4.

Four Twins made the All-Star Game: first baseman Killebrew, second baseman Carew, outfielder Oliva, and catcher Johnny Roseboro. Harmon Killebrew became the second Twin to be named American League Most Valuable Player.

1,349,328 fans attended Twins games, the third highest total in the American League.

Season standings

Record vs. opponents

Notable transactions 
 June 5, 1969: 1969 Major League Baseball draft
Bert Blyleven was drafted by the Twins in the 3rd round.
Jim Hughes was drafted by the Twins in the 33rd round.

Roster

Player stats

Batting

Starters by position 
Note: Pos = Position; G = Games played; AB = At bats; H = Hits; Avg. = Batting average; HR = Home runs; RBI = Runs batted in

Other batters 
Note: G = Games played; AB = At bats; H = Hits; Avg. = Batting average; HR = Home runs; RBI = Runs batted in

Pitching

Starting pitchers 
Note: G = Games pitched; IP = Innings pitched; W = Wins; L = Losses; ERA = Earned run average; SO = Strikeouts

Other pitchers 
Note: G = Games pitched; IP = Innings pitched; W = Wins; L = Losses; ERA = Earned run average; SO = Strikeouts

Relief pitchers 
Note: G = Games pitched; W = Wins; L = Losses; SV = Saves; ERA = Earned run average; SO = Strikeouts

Postseason 

The Twins were swept 3–0 by the Baltimore Orioles in the 1969 American League Championship Series.

Awards and honors

Along with MVP winner Killebrew, starting pitcher Jim Perry, Carew, shortstop Leo Cardenas, relief pitcher Ron Perranoski, Oliva, and utility man Cesar Tovar all received votes in American League MVP balloting, finishing in 9th, 10th, 12th, 13th, 15th and 17th place, respectively.

Perry finished in third place in American League Cy Young Award balloting.

Farm system 

LEAGUE CHAMPIONS: Charlotte

Notes

References 
Player stats from www.baseball-reference.com
Team info from www.baseball-almanac.com

Minnesota Twins seasons
Minnesota Twins season
American League West champion seasons
Minnesota Twins